The Golden Chance is a 1915 American drama film directed by Cecil B. DeMille. A print of the film survives at George Eastman House. DeMille remade the film in 1921 as Forbidden Fruit.

Cast
 Cleo Ridgely as Mary Denby
 Wallace Reid as Roger Manning
 Horace B. Carpenter as Steve Denby
 Ernest Joy as Mr. Hillary
 Edythe Chapman as Mrs. Hillary
 Raymond Hatton as Jimmy The Rat
 Lucien Littlefield as Roger Manning's Valet - Introductory Sequence (uncredited)

References

External links
 

1915 films
1915 drama films
American silent feature films
American black-and-white films
Silent American drama films
Films directed by Cecil B. DeMille
1910s American films